"Monarch" is the first single from Delerium's album Music Box Opera featuring Lebanese singer Nadina.

Remixes were made by Molitor, James Hockley, knifed and Bause.

A music video was also directed with a low budget aimed at social media like Facebook and YouTube, according to Bill Leeb. He also stated that this single was a sort of viral single release, mostly to get things moving.

Track listing
 Digital Release - 2012
 "Monarch (Album Version)" - 5:18
 "Monarch (Radio Edit) " - 4:00
 "Monarch (Bause Remix)" - 6:35 Beatport Exclusive
 "Monarch (Molitor Remix) " - 5:07
 "Monarch (James Hockley Remix) " - 6:05
 "Monarch (knifed Remix) " - 5:04
 "Monarch (Bause Radio Edit) " - 3:33
 "Monarch (James Hockley Radio Edit)" - 3:00
 "Monarch (Molitor Radio Edit)" - 3:16
 "Monarch (Molitor Dub Mix)" - 5:07
 "Monarch (Bause Instrumental Mix)" - 6:35

Charts

References

Delerium songs
2012 singles
2012 songs
Songs written by Bill Leeb
Nettwerk Records singles
Songs written by Rhys Fulber